A by-election was held in the Dáil Éireann Dublin West constituency in Ireland on 2 April 1996. It followed the death of Fianna Fáil Teachta Dála (TD) and former Tánaiste Brian Lenihan Snr on 1 November 1995.

The election was won by Brian Lenihan Jnr of Fianna Fáil, the son of Brian Lenihan Snr.

Among the candidates were Fingal County Councillor and future TD and MEP Joe Higgins, Fingal County Councillor and future Senator Tom Morrissey, Dublin City Councillor and former TD Tomás Mac Giolla, Fingal County Councillor and future Senator Sheila Terry, future TD Paul Gogarty, Dublin City Councillor Vincent Jackson and Fingal County Councillor Sean Lyons

On the same day, a by-election took place in Donegal North-East.

Result

See also
List of Dáil by-elections
Dáil constituencies

Footnotes

External links
http://irelandelection.com/election.php?elecid=75&constitid=94&electype=2
https://www.electionsireland.org/result.cfm?election=1992B&cons=112&ref=115

1996 in Irish politics
1996 elections in the Republic of Ireland
27th Dáil
By-elections in the Republic of Ireland
Elections in County Dublin
April 1996 events in Europe